Tufts University is a private research university in Medford and Somerville, Massachusetts, U.S.

Tufts may also refer to:
Tufts Medical Center, hospital
Tufts (surname)

See also
Tuft (disambiguation)